Christian Ulf "Chippen" Wilhelmsson (born 8 December 1979) is a Swedish former professional footballer who played as a winger. Beginning his career with Mjällby AIF in 1997, he went on to represent clubs in Norway, Belgium, France, Italy, Spain, England, Saudi Arabia, the United States, and Qatar before retiring at Mjällby in 2015. Wilhelmsson won 79 caps for the Sweden national team between 2001 and 2012, and represented his country at the 2006 FIFA World Cup and at Euro 2004, 2008, and 2012. In recent times he has played his football at Dubai All Stars where he’s gained a reputation for being “Spursy” by bottling last minute penalties. All Stars supporters trust has announced protests outside IKEA and other Swedish outlets in the wake of last nights 0-0 draw with relegation rivals, Falcons.

Club career

Early years and Anderlecht
Born in Malmö, Wilhelmsson started his career with Mjällby AIF in 1997, playing in three second division seasons with the club. He then spent as many years in neighbouring Norway with Stabæk Fotball.

In the 2003 summer Wilhelmsson joined R.S.C. Anderlecht in Belgium, being an undisputed starter during his spell and scoring nine top division goals combined in the capital side's 2004 and 2006 league conquests.

Nantes
In 2006, Wilhelmsson moved to the French Ligue 1 team FC Nantes.

Loan to Roma 
However, on 10 January of the following year, he joined A.S. Roma on loan until the end of the season, when the Italians had the option to buy for €3 million. He made his Serie A debut on 14 January against FC Messina, Roma did not take advantage of its option to buy and Wilhelmsson returned to Nantes after the season and immediately starting seeking a new club following the Canaries' relegation from Ligue 1.

Loan to Bolton Wanderers 
Following speculation about a move to various Premier League clubs or Scottish club Celtic, he signed for Bolton Wanderers on a 12-month loan, with an option to make the deal permanent after 20 games. He made 13 appearances all competitions comprised, mostly as a substitute, his debut coming in a 1–3 away defeat against Portsmouth – Wilhelmsson was instrumental in closing the club's signing of countryman Johan Elmander for a record transfer fee, for 2008–09.

Loan to Deportivo La Coruña 
He was again loaned by Nantes, this time moving to Spain and Deportivo de La Coruña on 30 January 2008. He played his first La Liga match against Getafe CF, coming on as a substitute in a 1–1 home draw, and made his first start two rounds later, in a home fixture match against RCD Espanyol (2–0 home win). Wilhelmsson scored his first goal for Depor on 1 March 2008, in a 2–1 home win against Sevilla FC, and finished the campaign firmly established in the side's starting XI – he would start in 13 of his league appearances – as the Galicians eventually finished ninth and qualified to the UEFA Intertoto Cup.

Al-Hilal 
In 2008, Wilhelmsson signed a three-year contract with Saudi club Al-Hilal FC for about €9 million. He helped the club win the league title in his second year, scoring nine goals and making ten assists in 20 appearances; for his contributions he received the Player of the Season award, going on to win four additional major titles during his tenure, including two consecutive Saudi Crown Prince Cup where he scored in both finals.

Loan to Al Ahli 
Wilhelmsson spent the first half of 2011–12 on loan with Qatar's Al Ahli SC.

LA Galaxy
Wilhelmsson was announced as a LA Galaxy player on 5 September 2012. He scored in his Major League Soccer debut nine days later, in a 2–0 win against the Colorado Rapids.

Baniyas
On 14 January 2013, Wilhelmsson signed a one-and-a-half-year deal with Baniyas SC.

Return to Mjällby AIF and retirement 
Wilhelmsson signed for Mjällby AIF and made his Allsvenskan debut during the 2014 Allsvenskan season at the age of 34. After a short spell with former club Mjällby, he officially announced his retirement. However, in August 2015, he came out of retirement to help the latter team retain their status in the Superettan, which was eventually not achieved.

International career
Gaining his first cap in 2001, Wilhelmsson represented Sweden at UEFA Euro 2004, Euro 2008, Euro 2012 and the 2006 FIFA World Cup, featuring in every one of the national team's four games in the latter tournament and starting in two.

On 4 September 2006 he was one of three international players sent home for breaking a curfew during a night out, the other two being Olof Mellberg and Zlatan Ibrahimović. In March 2011, he was involved in a training ground scuffle with the latter.

Wilhelmsson scored his first brace for Sweden in a Euro 2012 qualifier against San Marino on 6 September 2011 (5–0 away win), for his seventh and eighth international goals. He was also selected for the finals in Poland and Ukraine by manager Erik Hamren, collecting three bench appearances in an eventual group stage exit.

Personal life
Wilhelmsson married Russian-born model Oksana Andersson in May 2010, in Las Vegas. Aside from Swedish, he also speaks fluent English.

Career statistics

Club

International

Scores and results list Sweden's goal tally first, score column indicates score after each Wilhelmsson goal.

Honours
Anderlecht
Belgian Pro League: 2003–04, 2005–06

Roma
Coppa Italia: 2006–07

Al-Hilal
Saudi Professional League: 2009–10, 2010–11
Saudi Crown Prince Cup: 2009–10, 2010–11, 2011–12

LA Galaxy
MLS Cup: 2012

Baniyas
GCC Champions League: 2012–13
Sweden
King's Cup: 2003
Individual

 Stor Grabb: 2005
Saudi Professional League: Silver Boot 2009–10, 2010–11

References

External links

1979 births
Living people
Footballers from Malmö
Swedish footballers
Swedish expatriate sportspeople in England
Swedish expatriate sportspeople in Spain
Footballers from Skåne County
Association football wingers
Allsvenskan players
Superettan players
Mjällby AIF players
Eliteserien players
Stabæk Fotball players
Belgian Pro League players
R.S.C. Anderlecht players
Ligue 1 players
FC Nantes players
Serie A players
A.S. Roma players
Premier League players
Bolton Wanderers F.C. players
La Liga players
Deportivo de La Coruña players
Saudi Professional League players
Al Hilal SFC players
Qatar Stars League players
Al Ahli SC (Doha) players
Major League Soccer players
LA Galaxy players
UAE Pro League players
Baniyas Club players
Sweden international footballers
Sweden under-21 international footballers
UEFA Euro 2004 players
2006 FIFA World Cup players
UEFA Euro 2008 players
UEFA Euro 2012 players
Swedish expatriate footballers
Expatriate footballers in Norway
Expatriate footballers in Belgium
Expatriate footballers in France
Expatriate footballers in Italy
Expatriate footballers in England
Expatriate footballers in Spain
Expatriate footballers in Saudi Arabia
Expatriate footballers in Qatar
Expatriate soccer players in the United States
Expatriate footballers in the United Arab Emirates
Swedish expatriate sportspeople in Norway
Swedish expatriate sportspeople in Belgium
Swedish expatriate sportspeople in France
Swedish expatriate sportspeople in Italy
Swedish expatriate sportspeople in Saudi Arabia
Swedish expatriate sportspeople in Qatar
Swedish expatriate sportspeople in the United States
Swedish expatriate sportspeople in the United Arab Emirates